Alexander Bonde (born 12 January 1975 in Freiburg im Breisgau) is a German politician of Alliance 90/The Greens who has been serving as the secretary-general of the German Federal Environment Foundation (DBU) since 2018.

Early life and education
In 1992 and 1993 Bonde was an exchange student at Kahuku High School (Oahu, Hawaii, USA). One of his classmates was Jack Johnson.

Political career

Member of the Bundestag, 2002–2011
From 2002 to 2011, Bonde was a member of the Bundestag. There he represented his constituency 283 Emmendingen-Lahr, a rural area in the Black Forest that covers 41 municipalities in the state of Baden-Württemberg. Bonde was first elected in 2002 and was reelected in 2005 and 2009.

Bonde served on the Defense Committee and on the Budget Committee. He was also a member of the Financial Markets Committee that supervises the German banking rescue package. On the Budget Committee, Bonde served as “rapporteur-general” for agriculture (the equivalent to chairing a small subcommittee) as “rapporteur” (equivalent to being a member of a small subcommittee) for defence, economy and labor.

In addition to his committee assignments, Bonde served as vice-chairman of the German-American Parliamentary Group and of the Aviation & Space Caucus of the German Bundestag.

State Minister for Rural Areas and Consumer Rights, 2011–2016
In 2011, Bonde was appointed State Minister for Rural Areas, Agriculture and Consumer Rights in the state government of Baden-Württemberg under Minister-President Winfried Kretschmann. On 12 May 2016 Peter Hauk (CDU) became his successor.

Later career
In December 2017, the board of trustees of the German Federal Environment Foundation (DBU) – at the time chaired by Rita Schwarzelühr-Sutter – appointed Bonde as the organization's secretary general.

In the negotiations to form another coalition government under Kretschmann's leadership following the 2021 state elections, Bonde was a member of the working group on climate, environmental policy and energy, co-chaired by Sandra Detzer and Andreas Jung.

Other activities
 Vodafone Germany, Member of the Advisory Board on Sustainability (since 2020)

References

External links 

 Official website 
 Bundestag biography 
 Bündnis 90/Die Grünen biography 

1975 births
Living people
Politicians from Freiburg im Breisgau
University of Freiburg alumni
Members of the Bundestag for Baden-Württemberg
Members of the Bundestag 2009–2013
Members of the Bundestag 2005–2009
Members of the Bundestag 2002–2005
Members of the Bundestag for Alliance 90/The Greens